The men's 73 kilograms (Lightweight) competition at the 2006 Asian Games in Doha was held on 4 December at the Qatar SC Indoor Hall.

Schedule
All times are Arabia Standard Time (UTC+03:00)

Results
Legend
WO — Won by walkover

Main bracket

Final

Top half

Bottom half

Repechage

References
Results

External links
Official website

M73
Judo at the Asian Games Men's Lightweight